The Boston Society of Film Critics Award for Best Cast is one of the annual film awards given by the Boston Society of Film Critics.

Winners

2000s
 2003: Mystic River
Kevin Bacon, Laurence Fishburne, Marcia Gay Harden, Laura Linney, Sean Penn, and Tim Robbins

 2004: Sideways
Thomas Haden Church, Paul Giamatti, Virginia Madsen, and Sandra Oh

 2005: Syriana
George Clooney, Chris Cooper, Matt Damon, Kayvan Novak, Amanda Peet, Christopher Plummer, and Jeffrey Wright

 2006: United 93
 2007: Before the Devil Knows You're Dead
Albert Finney, Rosemary Harris, Ethan Hawke, Philip Seymour Hoffman, and Marisa Tomei

 2008: Tropic Thunder
Jay Baruchel, Jack Black, Steve Coogan, Tom Cruise, Robert Downey Jr., Bill Hader, Brandon T. Jackson, Reggie Lee, Danny McBride, Matthew McConaughey, Nick Nolte, Brandon Soo Hoo, and Ben Stiller

 2009: Precious / Star Trek (TIE)
Stephanie Andujar, Mariah Carey, Lenny Kravitz, Chyna Layne, Mo'Nique, Paula Patton, Amina Robinson, Sherri Shepherd, Gabourey Sidibe, and Angelic Zambrana
Eric Bana, John Cho, Clifton Collins Jr., Ben Cross, Bruce Greenwood, Chris Pine, Zachary Quinto, Zoe Saldana, Karl Urban, and Anton Yelchin

2010s
 2010: The Fighter
Amy Adams, Christian Bale, Melissa Leo, Jack McGee, and Mark Wahlberg
 2011: Carnage
Jodie Foster, John C. Reilly, Christoph Waltz, and Kate Winslet
 2012: Seven Psychopaths
Abbie Cornish, Colin Farrell, Woody Harrelson, Olga Kurylenko, Sam Rockwell, Tom Waits, and Christopher Walken
 2013: Nebraska
Bruce Dern, Will Forte, Stacy Keach, Bob Odenkirk, and June Squibb
 2014: Boyhood
Ellar Coltrane, Patricia Arquette, Lorelei Linklater, and Ethan Hawke
 2015: Spotlight
Michael Keaton, Mark Ruffalo, Rachel McAdams, Stanley Tucci, Liev Schreiber, Brian d'Arcy James, and John Slattery
 2016: Moonlight
Mahershala Ali, Alex R. Hibbert, Naomie Harris, André Holland, Jharrel Jerome, Janelle Monáe, Jaden Piner, Trevante Rhodes, and Ashton Sanders
 2017: The Meyerowitz Stories
Candice Bergen, Judd Hirsch, Dustin Hoffman, Elizabeth Marvel, Rebecca Miller, Grace Van Patten, Adam Sandler, Ben Stiller, and Emma Thompson
 2018: Shoplifters
Lily Franky, Sakura Ando, Mayu Matsuoka, Kairi Jō, Miyu Sasaki and Kirin Kiki
 2019: Little Women
Saoirse Ronan, Emma Watson, Florence Pugh, Eliza Scanlen, Laura Dern, Timothée Chalamet, Meryl Streep, Tracy Letts, Bob Odenkirk, James Norton, Louis Garrel and Chris Cooper

2020s
 2020: Ma Rainey's Black Bottom
Chadwick Boseman, Viola Davis, Colman Domingo, Michael Potts, and Glynn Turman
 2021: Licorice Pizza
 Alana Haim, Cooper Hoffman, Sean Penn, Tom Waits, Bradley Cooper and Benny Safdie
 2022: Women Talking / Jackass Forever (tie)

See also
Robert Altman Award

References

Film awards for Best Cast
Boston Society of Film Critics Awards
Awards established in 2003